Adrian Kenny (born 1945) is an Irish writer.

Life
Adrian Kenny was born in Dublin in 1945.  
 
He was educated at Gonzaga College, and then studied History at University College Dublin.

After graduation he worked as an English teacher in Ireland and abroad, and also as a freelance journalist.

He is a member of Aosdána, the Irish Academy of the Arts.

Works

Novel
 The feast of Michaelmas (Co-Op Books, 1979)

Short stories 
 Arcady (1983)
 Portobello Notebook (Lilliput Press, 2012)

Autobiography 
 Before the Wax Hardened (Lilliput Press, 1991)
 Istanbul Diary (Poolbeg Press, 1994)
 The Family Business (Lilliput Press, 1999)

Other Work  
 The Journal of Arland Ussher. Edited by Adrian Kenny. (Raven Arts, 1980)
 An Caisideach Ban. The Songs and Adventures of Tomas O Caiside. Translated from the Irish by Adrian Kenny. (Greens Print, 1993)

References

 4 Literature Ireland
 5 Ricorso

1945 births
Aosdána members
20th-century Irish male writers
21st-century Irish male writers
Living people
Writers from Dublin (city)